The Wildpark Eekholt is a wildlife park near Großenaspe (Schleswig-Holstein). It hosts about 100 species in Central Europe with over 700 animals on an area of 67 hectares, which nature has designed.
	
The zoo was founded in 1970. It is also a place of education for the protection of the environment.

External links 

Brief portrait with all the important information in Zoo-Infos (de)

Eekholt
Tourist attractions in Schleswig-Holstein
Buildings and structures in Schleswig-Holstein
Wildlife parks
Segeberg